Steve Crossley (born 28 November 1990), also known by the nickname of "Shrek", is an English rugby league footballer who plays as a  for the Hunslet RLFC in the Betfred League 1.

He has previously played for Bradford and the Castleford Tigers (Heritage № 954) in the Super League, and the Dewsbury Rams, Featherstone Rovers and the Bulls in the Championship. Crossley has also played for the Toronto Wolfpack in League 1.

Background
Crossley was born in Bradford, West Yorkshire, England. He attended Thornton Grammar School where he was first introduced to rugby league through friends that played locally. 

He then began his career playing for the local side Clayton ARLFC, coached by Lee Jones and Andy Hainsworth. After excelling within the team he was picked to represent the Bradford and Keighley Service area, Yorkshire, and Great Britain. He was then signed to his home town academy side the Bradford Bulls, beginning his professional career.

Playing career
Crossley was signed from Clayton RLFC by the Bradford Bulls. He made his Super League début in 2010 against Crusaders Rugby League. During the 2011 season Crossley was released from his contract with Bradford, joining Dewsbury Rams.

Crossley played for Dewsbury in 2012, before joining Featherstone Rovers for the 2013 and 2014 seasons. He impressed for Featherstone and was signed by Castleford Tigers, making his début for the club in the first match of the 2015 Super League season. Crossley made 6 appearances in Super League for Castleford before being released from his contract in April 2015, rejoining the Bradford Bulls on a two-year deal. In November 2016 he signed a one-year deal with Toronto Wolfpack. He returned to the Bradford Bulls on a two-year deal signed in October 2017.

Statistics
Statistics do not include pre-season friendlies.

References

External links
Bradford Bulls profile
Toronto Wolfpack profile
Cas Tigers profile
 Crossley earns full-time deal
 Bulls profile

1990 births
Living people
Bradford Bulls captains
Bradford Bulls players
Castleford Tigers players
Dewsbury Rams players
English rugby league players
Featherstone Rovers players
Hunslet R.L.F.C. captains
Hunslet R.L.F.C. players
Rugby league players from Bradford
Rugby league props
Toronto Wolfpack players